Elinore Denniston (September 20, 1900 – May 24, 1978) was an American writer of more than 40 mystery novels under the pseudonym Rae Foley  She wrote other mysteries as Helen K. Maxwell and Dennis Allan. She also wrote books for children. In a brief comment in Twentieth Century Crime and Mystery Writers, author Herbert Harris describes her as "one of the most prolific and successful of America's 'romantic suspense' novelists...".

Biography
Elinore Denniston was born on September 20, 1900, in North Dakota. She began writing under the pseudonym Dennis Allen in 1936. She worked as an assistant to the playwright Theresa Helburn. She also worked as an assistant to Eleanor Roosevelt. She died on May 24, 1978, in Phoenix, Arizona.

Bibliography

Mystery novels

As Dennis Allan
 House of Treason (1936)
 Brandon Is Missing (1940)
 The Case of the Headless Corpse (1940)
 Born to Be Murdered (1952)
 Dead to Rights (1953)

As Rae Foley
 No Tears for the Dead (1948)
 Girl from Nowhere (1949)
 Bones of Contention (1950)
 The Hundredth Door (1950)
 An Ape in Velvet (1951)
 Wake the Sleeping Wolf (1952)
 Don't Kill, My Love (1952)
 The Man in the Shadow (1953)
 Death and Mr. Potter (1955)
 Dark Intent (1955)
 The Last Gamble (1956)
 Run for Your Life (1957)
 Where Is Mary Bostwick? (1958)
 It's Murder, Mr. Potter (1961)
 Repent at Leisure: a Mr. Potter Mystery (1962)
 Back Door to Death, a Mr. Potter Mystery (1963). Republished as Nightmare Honeymoon (1976).
 Scared to Death (1963)
 Fatal Lady: A Mr. Potter Mystery (1964)
 Suffer a Witch (1965)
 Call It Accident (1965)
 Wild Night (1966)
 The Shelton Conspiracy (1967)
 Fear of a Stranger (1967)
 Nightmare House (1968)
 No Hiding Place (1969)
 Girl on a High Wire (1969)
 A Calculated Risk (1970)
 This Woman Wanted (1971)
 Ominous Star (1971)
 Sleep Without Morning (1972)
 The First Mrs. Winston (1972)
 Malice Domestic (1972)
 Trust a Woman? (1973)
 One O'clock at the Gotham (1974)
 Dangerous to Me (1974)
 The Dark Hill (1974)
 The Brownstone House (1974)
 Put Out the Light (1976)
 Where Helen Lies (1976)
 Murder by Bequest (1976)
 The Slippery Step: A Novel of Suspense (1977)
 The Barclay Place (1978)
 The Girl Who Had Everything (1978)

As Elinore Denniston
 Madness in the Spring (1954)

As Helen K. Maxwell
 The Girl in a Mask (1970)
 Leave It to Amanda (1972)
 The Livingston Heirs (1973)

Other

As Elinore Denniston
Translation of Gouverneur Morris, Witness of Two Revolutions by Daniel Walther (1934)
 America's Silent Investigators; The Story of the Postal Inspectors Who Protect the United States Mail (1964)

As Elinore Denniston with Catherine Barjansky
 Portraits with Backgrounds (1948)

As Rae Foley
 Famous American Spies (1962)
 Famous Makers of America (1963)

References

1900 births
1978 deaths
20th-century American women writers
Writers from North Dakota
American mystery novelists